Respect All Fear None is the third studio album by Krumbsnatcha. It was released on October 8, 2002 via D&D Records making it his first and only album on the label. The album's audio production was handled by the Alchemist, Arabian Knight, Curt Cazal, Da Beatminerz, DJ Premier, Easy Mo Bee, Eric Wes, Nottz and Omen with executive production provided by D&D Records' founders David Lotwin and Douglas Grama. Boogieman, Buckshot, Craig G, Demorne Warren, Gang Starr, Jahdan Blakkamoore, Jaysaun, Kenyatta "Sharu" Jackson and Mexicana made their guest appearances on the album. It peaked at number 65 on the Top R&B/Hip-Hop Albums and number 38 on the Independent Albums. The album spawned three singles: "Oxygen"/"Strike Back (Closer To God Pt. II)", "Incredible"/"Streets Is Calling", and "Rich Man Poor Man"/"King Of All Kings", but none of them had reached music charts.

Track listing

Personnel 

 Demetrius Gibbs – main artist
 Keith Edward Elam – guest artist (track 4), associate executive producer
 Demorne Warren – guest artist (track 5)
 Kenyatta Blake – guest artist (track 7)
 Craig Curry – guest artist (track 7)
 Jason Rosenwald – guest artist (track 11)
 Wayne Sharne Henry – guest artist (track 12)
 Kenyatta "Sharu" Jackson – hoster/interviewer (track 15)
 Mexicana – guest artist (track 8)
 Boogieman – guest artist (track 9)
 Eric Wes – producer (tracks: 1, 12)
 Osten Harvey Jr. – producer (track 2)
 Christopher Edward Martin – producer (track 4)
 Da Beatminerz – producers (tracks: 5, 14)
 Curtis Andre Small – producer (tracks: 6, 7)
 Daniel Alan Maman – producer (track 8)
 Dominick J. Lamb – producer (track 9)
 Sidney "Omen" Brown – producer (track 10)
 Suleyman Ansari – producer (track 11)
 David Lotwin – executive producer
 Doug Grama – executive producer
 Kieran Walsh – mixing (tracks: 2, 5-12, 14), engineering
 Eddie Sancho – mixing (track 4)
 Dejuana Richardson – engineering
 Dexter Thibou – engineering
 Eric Steinen – engineering
 Tony Dawsey – mastering
 Atsuko Tanaka – photography

Charts

References

External links

2002 albums
Albums produced by Da Beatminerz
Albums produced by DJ Premier
Albums produced by Easy Mo Bee
Albums produced by Nottz
Albums produced by the Alchemist (musician)